Sta. Lucia Mall (formally Sta. Lucia East Grand Mall) is a shopping mall owned by Sta. Lucia Realty & Development Inc. It is situated at the intersection of Marcos Highway, and Felix Avenue (formerly known as Imelda Avenue), located at Barangay San Isidro, Cainta, Rizal, Philippines, beside Robinsons Metro East.

The mall opened in 1991 as a  shopping complex, the first in its locale. The mall is currently the largest shopping mall located in Rizal and Calabarzon in terms of floor area.

History 
In 1991, certain of the market potentials in the east side of the metropolis and driven by the desire to diversify, Sta. Lucia East Realty and Development, Inc. (SLRDI) built Phase 1 of Sta. Lucia East Grand Mall. Two years later, in 1993, Phase II was formally opened to offer better facilities, more specialty stores, service centers, additional cinemas, a 32-lane bowling center, an entertainment arcade and a junior department store.

On May 18, 1998, Phase III was unveiled which offered bigger spaces and more comprehensive shopping and entertainment facilities. In 2005, the mall's six cinemas were renovated and it became known as the Theatre Zone. The mall was declared as a Wi-Fi zone in 2007, offering free internet access to all shoppers.

In 2014, SLRDI has finished constructing the 3-level mall called iL Centro located next to the mall and is connected by a bridge offering more shops, and services. It will serve as the podium of the planned five-tower development called Sta. Lucia Residenzes. 

The mall is currently under redevelopment as of 2023.

Location 
The mall is located beside Robinsons Metro East and situated at the busy intersection of Marcos Highway, and Felix Avenue in Cainta, Rizal. It is highly accessible by jeepneys, buses, taxis, and even AUVs from the cities of Antipolo, Marikina, and Pasig, as well as the town itself. It is 5–10 minutes from Katipunan Avenue and Aurora Ave., a five-minute jeepney ride from Line 2 Santolan Station and directly connected to Aurora Boulevard via the highway itself. It has direct access to and from LRT-2's Marikina (Emerald) station.

It has been a popular place for people coming from the Eastern Metro Manila and Rizal, as all of the stores and services have been in existence even before other shopping malls were built.

Mall features 

The Sta. Lucia East Grand Mall complex has 4 buildings, which are interconnected by a footbridge.  The combined Phase 1 and Phase 2 of the mall has shops, services, and a supermarket located at the basement of the mall. It used to have cinemas on the third level, which are currently used for church services and masses. Home Gallery, located at the basement of the building, has a fine selection of décor, furniture and appliances.

Phase 3 has a three-level, full-line Department Store, a 7,000 square meter supermarket and a foodcourt on the lower ground floor, more upscale stores and restaurants, a 32-lane Bowling Center on the third floor, and a 10-meter high ceiling entertainment center called World of Fun along with the mall’s six cinemas on the fourth floor.

Phase 4 of the mall, il Centro, is a part of Sta. Lucia Residences, a 5-tower residential condominium, where two of which have been completed. Opened in 2014, it contains more shops and services, and is accessible via bridgeway to the mall itself. 

the six-story,  Sta. Lucia Business Center, which is located next to the mall. It will have a retail space on the first and second floors, and office spaces on the rest of the floors. It will be directly connected to the Line 2 Marikina Station and to the mall itself. The construction was finished by 2022

See also 
 Cainta, Rizal
 Ayala Malls Feliz
 Robinsons Metro East
 SM City Marikina
 SM City Masinag
 XentroMall Antipolo
 Vista Mall Antipolo

References

External links 
 Sta. Lucia Mall on Facebook

Shopping malls in Rizal
Shopping malls established in 1991
Buildings and structures in Cainta